State Route 198 (SR 198) is a state highway on Mount Desert Island, Hancock County, Maine. It goes from the village of Northeast Harbor within the town of Mount Desert to State Routes 3 and 102 in Bar Harbor. The route passes near the Gulf of Maine and through Acadia National Park.

Route description
SR 198 begins in the village of Northeast Harbor. It heads northward and has a concurrency with SR 3 from Northeast Harbor and intersects SR 233. Near Somesville, SR 3 ends but SR 198 turns north along the route of SR 102. Both routes have their northern end at SR 3.

Major junctions

References

External links

Floodgap Roadgap's RoadsAroundME: Maine State Route 198

Mount Desert Island
198
Transportation in Hancock County, Maine